11th Street station (signed as 11th Street–Pennsylvania Convention Center on platforms) is a subway station in Philadelphia, Pennsylvania at the intersection of 11th Street and Market Street in Center City. It is served by SEPTA's Market-Frankford Line and provides a connection to SEPTA Regional Rail at Jefferson Station.

The station is part of the Downtown Link concourse, a series of underground passageways outside fare control that access stations on the Market–Frankford Line, Broad Street Line, PATCO Speedline, and Regional Rail lines. 11th Street also has direct access to the Jefferson Tower and Fashion District Philadelphia shopping mall, and also serves the Pennsylvania Convention Center and the Philadelphia Greyhound Terminal.

History 
The station opened August 3, 1908 as part of the first extension of the Philadelphia Rapid Transit Company's Market Street Subway. The line had originally opened a year earlier between 69th Street and 15th Street stations.

11th Street is one of three stations on the Market–Frankford Line that is not ADA-accessible, the other two being  and  stations. The addition of elevators in the station was announced in SEPTA's 2021–2032 Capital Program proposal; the station platforms would be rehabilitated and made accessible to passengers with disabilities by 2023 at an estimated cost of $9.51 million. In 2022, SEPTA revised the project's budget to $23.81 million and estimated construction would be complete by 2025. The project now also includes the renovation of the existing platforms, new signage, lighting, and security cameras, as well as waterproofing improvements.

Station layout 
The station has two side platforms. A mezzanine above the platforms is divided into two sections, one inside fare control and one outside of it.

Image gallery

References

External links 

 11th Street entrance from Google Maps Street View

SEPTA Market-Frankford Line stations
Railway stations in Philadelphia
Railway stations in the United States opened in 1908
Market East, Philadelphia
Railway stations located underground in Pennsylvania
1908 establishments in Pennsylvania